Spiranthes sinensis, commonly known as the Chinese spiranthes, is a species of orchid occurring in eastern and southeastern Asia.

Spiranthes sinensis was long thought to be a species complex, and more than 30 names have been synonymized under it; recent molecular and morphological data found that the complex was composed of six distinct species. 'True' S. sinensis sensu stricto is glabrous, blooms in the spring, and has pale blush-pink flowers. This species had formerly been thought to occur throughout Asia and Australia, it is actually restricted to southeast Asia, eastern East Asia, and southern Japan. The other species to be recognized out of this species complex are Spiranthes australis, Spiranthes flexuosa, Spiranthes maokensis, Spiranthes sunii, and Spiranthes suishanensis.

References

External links 

sinensis
Orchids of New Zealand
Orchids of Russia
Flora of Siberia